Alternanthera filifolia is a species of flowering plant in the family Amaranthaceae. It is native to the Galápagos Islands.

This plant is limited to the Galápagos, but it is common there in lowlands and coastal shrublands. It is variable in morphology, forming shrubs 0.5 to 1.5 meters tall.

References

filifolia
Endemic flora of Galápagos
Least concern biota of South America
Least concern plants
Taxonomy articles created by Polbot